Frasne is a commune in the Doubs department in the Franche-Comté region in eastern France. Frasne may also refer to:

Frasne-les-Meulières, a commune in the Jura department in Franche-Comté in eastern France
Frasne-le-Château, a commune in the Haute-Saône department in the region of Franche-Comté in eastern France 

See also
Gare de Frasne, a railway station located in Frasne on the Dijon–Vallorbe railway and Frasne–Les Verrières railway 
Frasnes (disambiguation)